Clogwyn is an intermediate station on the Snowdon Mountain Railway. It is located on an exposed ridge overlooking the Llanberis Pass and Clogwyn Du'r Arddu cliffs, a popular climbing spot.
 

The station opened with the railway on 6 April 1896, but both closed the same day following an accident. They reopened on 9 April 1897 without mishap and have operated since except during wartime.

The station has one platform.

References

Sources

External links

 The line and its stations, via Snowdon Mountain Railway
 Edwardian 6" map showing the station, overlain with modern satellite images and maps, via National Library of Scotland
 The station and line, via Rail Map Online
 Images of the station and line, via Yahoo

Railway stations in Great Britain opened in 1896
Llanberis
Heritage railway stations in Gwynedd